Fullmer is a surname. Notable people with the surname include:

Baldwin W. Fullmer (1834–1910), American farmer, politician, newspaper editor and Methodist minister
Brad Fullmer (born 1975), American baseball player
David Fullmer (1803–1879), American politician, church leader and farmer
Don Fullmer (1939–2012), American boxer
Gene Fullmer (1931–2015), American boxer
John S. Fullmer (1807–1883), American politician and farmer
June Zimmerman Fullmer (1920–2000), American historian
Randy Fullmer (born 1950), American businessman
Steve Fullmer (born 1946), American-born New Zealand potter

See also
Meanings of minor planet names: 20001–21000#373